Kristiјan Miljević (born 15 July 1992) is a Swedish-born Serbian footballer who plays as a left winger for Nacka Iliria.

Career 
His father is from Serbia and his mother is Greek but Miljević grew up in Norrköping, Sweden where he started playing football. Miljević moved to PAOK youth academy at the age of 15. Lindö FF was his first club. Two years later he convinced manager Fernando Santos, now current manager in the Greece national team, that he should have a place in the team. He made his debut at the age of 17 against Aris. In August 2016 he moved to Superleague side Veria. After a poor season, with 14 appearances and 1 goal he left the club. On 17 July 2017, he joined Trikala. On 29 July 2018, Miljević signed with AFC Eskilstuna in Superettan, Sweden's second tier.

On 9 April 2021, Miljević signed with Nacka Iliria.

International career 
Coach Tomislav Sivić called him to Serbia U19.

Personal life
He is the younger brother of Michell Miljevic who currently plays for Vataniakos.

References

External links 
 

1992 births
Living people
Serbian footballers
Greek footballers
Swedish people of Serbian descent
Swedish people of Greek descent
Superettan players
IF Sylvia players
PAOK FC players
Brescia Calcio players
Levadiakos F.C. players
Paniliakos F.C. players
Veria F.C. players
Panegialios F.C. players
Trikala F.C. players
AFC Eskilstuna players
Serbian people of Greek descent
Greek people of Serbian descent
Association football wingers
Sportspeople from Norrköping
Footballers from Östergötland County
Serbian expatriate sportspeople in Greece
Swedish expatriate sportspeople in Greece
Serbian expatriate footballers
Swedish expatriate footballers
Expatriate footballers in Greece
Expatriate footballers in Italy
Serbian expatriate sportspeople in Italy
Swedish expatriate sportspeople in Italy